Tethina parvula is a species of fly in the family Canacidae.

References

Canacidae
Articles created by Qbugbot
Insects described in 1869